Rachel Elizabeth Pruden-Herndon (February 12, 1898 – January 10, 1979) was an American attorney who became the first African-American woman to be admitted to the State Bar of Georgia on December 27, 1942. In 1956, she became the first African-American woman from Georgia admitted to practice before the U.S. Supreme Court. She was later appointed as a municipal court judge in 1965.

Early life and education
Rachel Elizabeth Pruden was born on February 12, 1898, in Atlanta, Georgia. She attended Atlanta Public Schools, and graduated from Atlanta University. She studied law under attorney A. T. Walden, while working as his secretary.

References

1898 births
1979 deaths
African-American women lawyers
African-American lawyers
People from Atlanta
Georgia (U.S. state) lawyers
20th-century American women lawyers
20th-century American lawyers
20th-century African-American women
20th-century African-American people